Theresa "Terry" Wiseman (born 1956) is an English animator and former footballer. She played as a goalkeeper and represented England at senior international level.

Wiseman won 60 caps for England. After a period as understudy to England's original goalkeeper Sue Buckett, Wiseman made her debut on 23 July 1979, in a 2–0 win over Switzerland held in Sorrento, Italy during an unofficial European Championship. Ten years later she made her 50th appearance in a 2–0 home friendly defeat to Sweden. The match was held at Wembley Stadium to mark the 20th anniversary of the Women's Football Association (WFA), played as a curtain–raiser to the male national team's Rous Cup game against Chile. She had played in the penalty shootout defeat to Sweden in the 1984 European Competition for Women's Football final. At club level she played for Tottenham Hotspur's women's section and represented Friends of Fulham in the WFA Cup final. Wiseman won the WFA Cup in 1984 with Howbury Grange.

— Marieanne Spacey speaking to On the Ball magazine.

In her other career as an animator Wiseman worked on The Snowman and later moved to Los Angeles County to work for DisneyToon Studios, recently working as a timing director on Phineas and Ferb. She trained at Hornsey College of Art.

References

External links

1956 births
FA Women's National League players
Fulham L.F.C. players
Artists from London
English women's footballers
England women's international footballers
English animators
British women animators
Living people
Women's association football goalkeepers